The 2006 Washington Huskies football team represented the University of Washington in the 2006 NCAA Division I FBS football season. Led by second-year head coach Tyrone Willingham, the team compiled a 5–7 record and was ninth in the Pacific-10 Conference. Home games were played on campus at Husky Stadium in Seattle.

Background
Two years earlier in 2004, the Huskies had a dismal 1–10 season, with their lone victory over San Jose State. With three games remaining, second-year head coach Keith Gilbertson announced his resignation, effective at the end of the season.  Willingham was hired in December after being dismissed from Notre Dame.

While Washington saw an overall improvement on the team in 2005, they still struggled to win games, and finished with a 2–9 record. Highlights of the season were victories over Idaho and Pac-10 foe Arizona, and holding USC to 390 yards, their lowest offensive total of the year.

Pre-season
Redshirt freshman tailback J.R. Hasty was expected to have a big impact on the offense, but was declared academically ineligible.  Senior Isaiah Stanback and sophomore Johnny Durocher competed for the starting quarterback position.  Junior College transfers were Anthony Atkins (DE), Jason Wells (S), and Jordan Murchison (CB).  All were expected to fill holes in the team.

Washington did not appear in any pre-season rankings and was predicted to finish last in the Pac-10 media poll.

Pre-season awards
Sporting News Preseason All-Pac-10
C.J. Wallace - All-Pac-10 First Team
Sean Douglas - All-Pac-10 First Team
Scott White - All-Pac-10 Second Team
J.R. Hasty - Pac-10 Offensive Newcomer of the Year

Schedule

Season

San José State

Oklahoma

Fresno State

UCLA

Arizona

USC

In the fourth quarter, with 2 seconds left on the game clock, the Huskies moved the ball 15 yards shy of the end zone, stopping the clock by getting a first down.  Before Isaiah Stanback could hike the ball, the clock ran out and they were unable to get off a final play. It was a controversial moment that many blamed on miscommunication from the officials regarding when the clock would start again.

Oregon State

Linebacker Scott White intercepted two passes in the first half, setting up two touchdowns and giving Washington a 17–10 lead by halftime. However, the Huskies struggled in the second half both offensively and defensively. Oregon State quarterback Matt Moore connected with wide receiver Sammie Stroughter to give OSU a 27–17 lead. Late in the fourth quarter, Washington quarterback Isaiah Stanback suffered a Lisfranc fracture in his right foot; the injury requires surgery and Stanback will miss the remainder of the 2006 season.

California

Back-up quarterback Carl Bonnell made his first start of the season filling in for the injured Isaiah Stanback.  In his first start he threw two touchdown passes including a 40 yard hail mary pass to Marlon Wood to send the game into over time.  However, Bonnell also threw five interceptions in regulation, and one in over time.

Arizona State

Oregon

Stanford

Washington State

NFL Draft
Two Huskies were selected in the 2007 NFL Draft, which lasted seven rounds (255 selections).

References

Washington
Washington Huskies football seasons
Washington Huskies football